Malshan Rodrigo (born 3 January 1997) is a Sri Lankan cricketer. He made his first-class debut for Lankan Cricket Club in Tier B of the 2016–17 Premier League Tournament on 26 December 2016.

References

External links
 

1997 births
Living people
Sri Lankan cricketers
Lankan Cricket Club cricketers
Place of birth missing (living people)